Siti Mwinyi (born 1932) served as the second First Lady of Tanzania from 1985 to 1995.

References

Living people
1932 births
First Ladies of Tanzania